is a Japanese toy company responsible for many Famicom games in the late 1980s and 1990s. They were responsible for the critical and commercial bomb A Week of Garfield.

Products 
 TC-280 Transceiver (2,800 yen)
 TC-330 Transceiver 
 TC-380 Transceiver (3,800 yen)
 TC-480 Transceiver (4,800 yen)
 To in Harokuma (9,800 yen)
 To in Haroinu (12,800 yen)

Video games

Famicom 
 Sherlock Holmes: Hakushaku Reijō Yūkai Jiken
 Elnark no Zaihou
 Meitantei Holmes: Kiri no London Satsujin Jiken
 A Week of Garfield
 Meitantei Holmes: M-Kara no Chousenjou
 Idol Hakkenden
 Dragon Fighter

Game Boy 
 Taikyoku Renju
 Fish Dude

See also 

 List of Family Computer games
 List of video games notable for negative reception
 Japanese asset price bubble

References

Footnotes 
Attachment of consolidated interim financial statements Notice of Interim Financial Report March 2002 Towa Meccs Corporation Ltd. (November 15, 2001)

External links 
Towa Chiki at Giant Bomb
Towa Chiki at MobyGames
List of Towa Chiki games at GameFAQs

Software companies based in Tokyo
Manufacturing companies based in Tokyo
Toy companies established in 1986
Video game companies established in 1986
Defunct video game companies of Japan
Toy companies of Japan
Video game development companies
Video game publishers
Japanese companies established in 1986